Gaurishankar, a part of Bagmati Province, Nepal, is a rural municipality located in Dolakha District. With Suri as its current official headquarters, the rural municipality consists of nine wards (previously seven Village Development Committees) covers an area of 681.39 km² and has a population of 17,062 in 2011.

It is named after Mount Gaurishankar, which determines Nepal time (UTC +05:45), and is also home to Tsho Rolpa Lake (also Cho Rolpa, one of the biggest glacial lakes in Nepal.

Political divisions

The rural municipality consists of nine wards:

 Ward No. 1 (Previously Jugu V.D.C.)
 Ward No. 2 (Previously Jugu V.D.C.)
 Ward No. 3 (Previously Jhyaku V.D.C.)
 Ward No. 4 (Previously Jhyaku V.D.C.)
 Ward No. 5 (Previously Suri V.D.C.)
 Ward No. 6 (Previously Chankhu V.D.C.)
 Ward No. 7 (Previously Marbu V.D.C.)
 Ward No. 8 (Previously Khare V.D.C.)
 Ward No. 9 (Previously Gaurishankar V.D.C.)

Gallery
Photo gallery of Gurumfi, Gaurishankar Rural Municipality.

See also
Dolakha District
Bagmati Province
Rural municipality
List of Rural Municipalities in Nepal

References

External links

Populated places in Dolakha District
Rural municipalities in Dolakha District
Rural municipalities of Nepal established in 2017